London is the capital city and largest metropolitan region of both England and the United Kingdom.

London may also refer to:

Places

Europe

United Kingdom
 City of London, the "Square Mile" central business district of London, a ceremonial county with city status
 Greater London, a region of England and a related ceremonial county
 London postal district, a post town
 County of London, a county from 1889 to 1965
 Diocese of London, an Anglican diocese
 London (European Parliament constituency)
 Bay of London, a bay of Eday island, Orkney, Scotland

Elsewhere in Europe
 London, Belgrade, Serbia
 London, France
 Ny-London, an abandoned mining settlement in Svalbard, Norway

Americas

Canada
 London, Ontario
 London (electoral district), a federal electoral district from 1867 to 1968
 London District, Upper Canada, a district from 1798 to 1849

Chile
 London Island (Cook Island, Tierra del Fuego), an island east of Londonderry Island and south of Cockburn Channel

United States
 London, Arkansas, a city
 London, California, a census-designated place
 London, Indiana, an unincorporated community
 London, Kentucky, a city
 London, Michigan, a township
 London, Minnesota, an unincorporated community
 London, Ohio, a city
 London, Texas, an unincorporated community
 London, West Virginia, an unincorporated community
 London, Wisconsin, an unincorporated community

Oceania 
 London, Kiribati

Space
 8837 London, an asteroid

People and fictional characters
 London (name), people and a fictional character with either the surname or the given name

Arts, entertainment and media

Film
 London (1926 film), a British silent film
 London (1994 film), a British film by Patrick Keiller
 London (2005 American film), a drama film
 London (2005 Indian film), a Tamil action-comedy film starring Prashanth
 London Films, a film studio
 Namastey London, a 2007 Hindi film

Literature 
 London (Samuel Johnson poem)
 London (William Blake poem)
 "London, 1802", poem by William Wordsworth
 London, a non-fiction book by Steen Eiler Rasmussen, published in Danish in 1934, in English as London, the Unique City in 1937
 London (novel), by Edward Rutherfurd

Music

Classical pieces
London, suite by Eric Coates (1886-1957)

Groups and labels
 London (heavy metal band), American band
 London (punk band), British band
 London Records, a British label

Albums
 London (Apologies, I Have None album), 2012
 London (Jesus Jones album), 2001
London, by Streetband 1978
London, by Chava Alberstein 1989
London, by Greater Than One 1989
London, by D'Influence 1997
 London '66–'67, EP by Pink Floyd
London, EP by Radio Boy 1999
London, EP by Banks (singer) 2013
London, EP by DJ SS

Songs
 "London" (Pet Shop Boys song), 2002
 "London" (Bia and J. Cole song), 2022
 "London", 1986, by Queensrÿche from Rage for Order
 "London", 1987, by The Smiths from Louder Than Bombs
 "London", 1987, by Roger Hodgson from Hai Hai
 "London", 1997, by μ-Ziq from Lunatic Harness
 "London", 1997, by Third Eye Blind from Third Eye Blind
 "London", 1999, by Noonday Underground
 "London", 2009, by Adam Beyer
 "London", 2010, by AJ McLean from Have It All
 "London", 2013, by She & Him from She & Him Volume 3
 "London", 2017, by Maty Noyes
 "London", 2019, by Sarah Close
 "LDN" (song), 2006, by Lily Allen
 "The London", 2019, by Young Thug

Other uses in arts and entertainment
 London Group, an artists' exhibiting society
 London System, a chess opening

Brands and enterprises
 London Company, an English company established in 1606 to settle North America
 London Drugs, a retail chain

Ships and aircraft 
 London (ship), several merchant ships
 , several Royal Navy warships
 SS London (1864), steamship sunk in 1866
 Saro London, British biplane flying boat

Other uses 
 .london, top-level Internet domain for London
 'London', a red variety of Darwin tulip

See also
 
 
 Greater London, an administrative region consisting of 33 local government districts: the 32 London boroughs and the City of London
 Little London (disambiguation)